James Whitney (December 27, 1921 – April 8, 1982), younger brother of John, was a filmmaker regarded as one of the great masters of abstract cinema. Several of his films are classics in the genre of visual music.

Early life

James Whitney was born December 27, 1921, in Pasadena, California, and lived all his life in the Los Angeles area. He studied painting, and traveled in England before the outbreak of World War II. In 1940, he returned to Pasadena.

Career – early works 
James completed a number of short films over four decades, two of which required at least five years of work. James collaborated with his brother John for some of his early film work.

The first of the brothers' films was Twenty-Four Variations on an Original Theme. Its structure was influenced by Schoenberg's serial principles.

James spent 3 years working on Variations on a Circle (1942), which lasts some 20 minutes, and was made with 8mm film.

James and John created their series of Five Film Exercises (John #1 and #5; James #2, #3 and #4) between 1943 and 1944, for which the brothers won a prize for best sound at the 1949 Brussels Experimental Film Competition.

In 1946, the brothers travelled to San Francisco Museum of Modern Art to show their films at the first of ten annual "Art in Cinema" festivals, organized by Frank Stauffacher.

Following this period, James became more involved in spiritual interests such as Jungian psychology, alchemy, yoga, Tao, and Jiddu Krishnamurti.  These interests heavily influenced his later work.
James was a potter and ceramicist, interested in raku ware, and examples of his pottery still exist today.

Career – later works 

Between 1950 and 1955, James laboured to construct Yantra. The film was produced entirely by hand. By punching grid patterns in  cards with a pin, James was able to paint through these pinholes onto other  cards, to create images of rich complexity and give the finished work a very dynamic and flowing motion, but the film was not completed yet. It was first released as a silent film.

A very short, black and white, manipulated fragment from an early version of Yantra was shown at one of the historic Vortex Concerts in San Francisco's Morrison planetarium in early 1959. Soon after Vortex, the film acquired its soundtrack, when Jordan Belson synchronized it to an excerpt from Henk Badings’ "Cain and Abel". This did not occur at the Morrison Planetarium Vortex Concerts, contrary to popular belief (Keefer, 2008).

Analogue computer equipment developed by brother John, allowed James to complete Lapis (1966) in two years, when it might have taken seven years otherwise. James drew dot patterns again for this film, but the camera was positioned using computer control, allowing each image to be overlaid from multiple angles. In this piece, smaller circles oscillate in and out in an array of colors resembling a kaleidoscope while being accompanied by Indian sitar music. The patterns become hypnotic and trance inducing.

Dwija (1973), meaning "twice-born" or "soul" in Sanskrit, is completely solarized, and much of the imagery is re-photographed by rear-projection to create a constant flow of hardly definable transformations of color and form.

Wu Ming (1977), meaning "no name" in Chinese, repeats a single action over and over – a particle disappears into infinity, and returns as a wave. James described the particle-to-wave action in Wu Ming as being "like throwing a pebble into water and seeing the ripples spread out".

His two final films, intended to form a quartet with Dwija and Wu Ming, were Kang Jing Xiang and Li, which were left incomplete when James died April 8, 1982, after a brief and unexpected illness. Kang was completed post-humously according to James' instructions.  His short test for Li is believed to be lost.

Several of James' films were preserved by Center for Visual Music, Los Angeles (CVM); HD transfers from their preservation project were seen in major museum exhibitions including Visual Music at MOCA and The Hirshhorn Museum (2005), Sons et Lumieres at Centre Pompidou (2004–05), The Third Mind at The Guggenheim Museum, and other shows. Scholars may view high quality copies of Yantra and Lapis at CVM. CVM also provided prints from this preservation to Centre Pompidou, Paris, which provided support for this project. As of this writing in 2017, the films are largely not in distribution, and difficult to rent or screen.

Archive
The Academy Film Archive houses the Whitney Collection and has preserved over a dozen films from the collection. The collection encompasses the work of John and James Whitney, as well as John's sons Mark, John, and Michael.

Filmography

Twenty Four Variations on an Original Theme (with John Whitney) (1939–1940) 5 min, 8mm
3 Untitled Films (with John Whitney) (1940–1942) 15 min 8mm
Variations on a Circle (1941–1942) 9 min, 8mm
Film Exercises #2, #3 (1943–1944) 3 min, 16mm and #4 (1944) 8 min, 16mm. Actually he is credited along with his brother John for their Film Exercises 1 - 5.
Yantra (1950–1957) 8 min, 16mm. Sound added in 1959.
Lapis (1963–1966) 10 min, 16mm
Dwija (1973), 16mm. 
Wu Ming (1977) 17 min, 16mm.  
Kang Jing Xiang  (1982) 13 min, 16mm. Completed posthumously.
Li (unfinished)

OTHER:
High Voltage (1959) 3 min, 16mm, constructed by Jordan Belson from James' footage, not directed by James

Further reading 
Willis, Holly: Cinema Du Dots: LA Weekly, 2005

Moritz, William. "James Whitney." Articulated Light: The Emergence of Abstract Film. Boston: Harvard Film Archives, 1996

Moritz, William. "James Whitney." L'art du Mouvement: Cinema du Musee National d'art Moderne. Paris: Centre Pompidou, 1996

Moritz, William. "In Memoriam James Whitney." Osnabruck Media Art Festival program May 1996.

Bendazzi, Giannalberto. Cartoons. Bloomington and Indianapolis: Indiana University Press, 1995.

Sightlines. New York: Educational Film Library Association, Winter 1985–86

Moritz, William. "The Poetic Eye-- Visionary Filmmaker James Whitney, An Appreciation." The Advocate. Los Angeles: David B. Goodstein, April 2, 1985.

Whitney, James. "Yantra." New Magazine Beyond Baroque Foundation, May 1977

Sitney, P. Adams. Visionary Film: The American Avant Garde 1943–1978. New York: Oxford University Press, 1974.

Jacobs, Lewis. "Avant-Garde Production in America." Experiment in Film. New York: Arno Press, 1970

Keefer, Cindy. "Cosmic Cinema and The Vortex Concerts." Cosmos: The Search for the Origins, from Kupka to Kubrick. Arnauld Pierre, Ed. Madrid:El Umbral/Santa Cruz de Tenerife:TEA, 2008. (on Yantra)

References

External links

Photograph of James and John Whitney and their equipment
Brief excerpt from an Interview with James Whitney, 1974
Whitney-inspired musical animations created by Jim Bumgardner
Interview with Museum of the Moving Image guest curators Leo Goldsmith and Gregory Zinman on Science & Film about James Whitney's work

1921 births
1982 deaths
American film directors
American animated film directors
American animators
Whitney, John
Whitney, John
American expatriates in the United Kingdom